César Vega may refer to:

César Vega (agronomist) (born 1962), Uruguayan agronomist and politician
César Vega (footballer) (born 1959), Uruguayan football defender and coach
César Valverde Vega (1928–1998), Costa Rican painter